Henri Lucien Ernest Eugène Anspach (10 July 1882 in Belgium  – 29 March 1979) was a Belgian épée and foil fencer. He was an Olympic champion in team épée.

Olympic fencing career
Anspach, who was Jewish, was born in Brussels, Belgium. He competed for the Belgian fencing team at the 1912 Summer Olympics. He won a gold medal in the team épée competition, along with teammates were Jacques Ochs, Gaston Salmon, and brother Paul Anspach.

Anspach also competed on the men's sabre team, which came in fifth.

In individual events, Anspach finished 16th in foil and 12th in épée.

Later life
Anspach later became a painter.

See also
 List of select Jewish fencers

References

External links
 Olympic record

1882 births
1979 deaths
Belgian male fencers
Belgian épée fencers
Belgian foil fencers
Jewish male épée fencers
Jewish male foil fencers
Jewish male sabre fencers
Jewish Belgian sportspeople
Olympic fencers of Belgium
Fencers at the 1912 Summer Olympics
Olympic gold medalists for Belgium
Place of birth missing
Olympic medalists in fencing
Medalists at the 1912 Summer Olympics
20th-century Belgian people